Kasta (Russian for caste) is a Russian rap group from Rostov-on-Don. The group is led by MC and producer Vladi. Other members include MCs Shym, Khamil and Zmey, as well as DJ Khobot. Kasta’s past members also include Denis Torikashvili. Kasta is notably influenced by New York City rap tradition, especially Wu-Tang Clan.

History 
Vlady, Shim and Hamil all started listening to rap at a very young age. Vlady created his first song when he was just 13 years old. In 1995, he and his friend Tidan (Тидан) made a group Psycholyric. One year after that Shim joined Psycholyric. In 1997, Psycholyric and other rappers from Rostov-on-Don made a group with the new name Kasta, the successor of Psycholyric (The name Kasta was created by the one of the new participants, Basta, who soon left the group and started the solo career) . Shortly afterwards, Tidan left the group. In 1999, Hamil joined Kasta. Kasta then created a group called Объединенная Каста (Obiedenennaya Kasta) which means United Kasta, due to the fact that the original group was becoming too large.
Their first show was in Rostov's famous rap club Duncan and Comanchero.

Formation 
 Влади (Vladi) — Лешкевич Владислав Валерьевич (Leshkevich Vladislav Valerievich, born December 17, 1978, in Rostov-on-Don)
 Шым (Shym) — Епифанов Михаил Олегович (Epifanov Mikhail Olegovich, born January 25, 1979, in Rostov-on-Don)
 Хамиль (Khamil) — Пасечный Андрей Леонидович (Pacechny Andrey Leonidovich, born October 19, 1979, in Rostov-on-Don)
 Змей (Zmey) — Антон Мишенин (Anton Mishenin, born 21 January 1982 in Rostov-on-Don). In 2005, he left the group Grani after the release of the album Kipesh and joined Kasta.

Members of Объединенная Каста (Obiedenennaya Kasta, United Kasta)

Западный Сектор (Zapadny Sektor, West Sector)
 Кактус (Kaktus)
 Панч (Punch)
 Майор (Mayor)

Грани (Grani, Facets)
 Тигра (Tigra)
 Тёмный (Tyomniy)
 Сям (Syam)

Бледнолицые Нигга'дяи (Blednolitsyie Niggadyai, Pale-Faced Rascals)
 Панама (Panama)
 Кальян (Kalian)

Песочные Люди (Pesochnyie Lyudi, Sand Men)
 Псих (Psych)
 Жара (Jara)

Доброе Зло (Dobroye Zlo, Kind Evil)
 Фетис (Fetis)
 Рока (Roka)
 Леон МС 161 (Leon MC 161)

Free MC's
 Маринесса Покарано (Marinessa Pokarano)
 Карабасс (KaraBass)
 Электроник (Electronic)
 Белый Будда (Belyi Buddah)

Discography

Albums
 2002: Громче воды, выше травы ("Gromche vody, vyshe travy", "Louder than Water, Taller than Grass")
 2002: Что нам делать в Греции? ("Chto nam delat v Greciee?", "What do we do in Greece?") [by Vladi]
 2004: Феникс ("Dank Kush") [by Khamil]
 2005: Кипеш ("Kipesh", "Bustle") [by Zmey and Grani]
 2008: Быль в глаза ("Byl v glaza", "Facts to the Eyes")
 2010: ХЗ ("kHa.Ze.") [by Khamil and Zmey]
 2011: ЖаЗ дуэт ("ZhaZ duet", "ZhaZ (Jazz) duo") (EP) [by Jara and Zmey]
 2012: Ясно! ("Yasno!", "Clear!") [by Vladi]
 2017: "Четырёхглавый орёт" ("Chetyrekhglaviy oret")
 2019: Другое слово ("Another word") [by Vladi]

Albums of United Kasta (Объединенная Каста)
 1997: Первый удар ("Pervy udar", "First Strike")
 1999: Трёхмерные рифмы ("Tryokhmernye rifmy", "3D Rhymes")
 2000: В полном действии ("V polnom deistviee", "In Full Force")

Mixtapes
 2001: На порядок выше ("Na poryadok vyshe", "Vastly beyond")
 2002: Горячее время ("Goryacheye vremya", "Hot time") [by Vladi]
 2003: Алкоголики ("Alkogoliki", "Alcoholics") [by Zmey and Grani]
 2006: По-приколу ("Po-prikolu", "For fun")

Music videos 
Мы Берём Это На Улицах ("My Beryom Eto Na Ulitsakh" / "We got it from the streets")  (2000)
На Порядок Выше ("Na Poryadok Vyshe" / "Level above")  (2001)
Про Макса ("Pro Maxa" / "About Max")  (2002)
Горячее Время ("Goryacheye Vremya" / "Hot time") (OST Антикиллер (Antikiller)) (2002)
Ревность ("Revnost'" / "Jealousy") (Влади (Vladi)) (2003)
Наши Люди ("Nashi Lyudi" / "Our People")  (Live at "Наши Люди '03") (2003)
Сестра ("Sestra" / "Sister")  (2005)
Черви Ненависти ("Chervi Nenavisti" / "Worms of Hate")  (Хамиль (Khamil) feat. Песочные Люди (Sand Men)) (2005)
Капсулы Скорости ("Kapsuly Skorosti" / "Speed capsules")  (2006)
Глупо, Но Класс ("Glupo, No Class" / "Stupid, but cool")  (Vladi feat. Gustavo) (2007)
Встреча ("Vstrecha" / "Meeting")  (2008)
Радиосигналы ("Radiosignaly" / "Radio signals")  (Vladi) (2008)
Вокруг Шум ("Vokrug Shum" / "Noise around us")  (2009)
Номерок ("Nomerok" / "The tab")  (Vladi feat. Крестная Семья (Godmother's family)) (2009)
Можно Всё ("Mozhno Vsyo" / "Everything's allowed")  (Vladi feat. Animal Jazz) (2009)
Встретимся У Холодильника ("Vstretimsya U Kholodil'nika" / "Meet me by the Fridge")  (Khamil, Iskra & DJ Hobot) (2009)
Закрытый Космос ("Zakrytyi Kosmos" / "Closed Space")  (Khamil) (2010)
Метла ("Metla" / "The Broom")  (Khamil & Zmey) (2011)
Самый счастливый человек на Земле ("Samyy schastlivyy chelovek na Zemle" / "The happiest man of the Earth") (Zmey) (2011)
Миллиард Лет ("Milliard Let" / "Billion Years") (2011)
Выше к небу ("Vyshe k nebu" / "Higher to the sky") (Vladi feat. Песочные Люди (Sand Men)) (2011)
Это Прёт ("Eto Pryot" / "It hauls hard")  (Khamil & Zmey) (2011)
Такое чувство ("Takoe Chuvstvo" / "Such a feeling") (Khamil & Zmey) (2011)
Сочиняй мечты ("Sochinyay Mechty" / "Make dreams") (Vladi feat. Уля (Ulya) (Wow Band)) (2012)
Пусть пригодится ("Pust' Prigoditsya" / "Let be useful") (Vladi) (2012)
Тебе в прикол ("Tebe v prikol" / "Good for you") (2012)
Прощание ("Proshchaniye" / "Farewell") (Vladi) (2012)
На миг ("Na mig" / "For a moment") (Khamil and Zmey feat. Sand Men) (20??)

Awards 
 Grand Prix "Rap Music 99"
 Russian Music Awards 2004 MTV - Best hip-hop, rap project.
 Muz-TV Awards 2006 - Best hip-hop, rap project.
 RAMP 2009 - Urbana.
 Russian Street Awards 2010 - Best Acoustic ("Vokrug Shum" / "Noise around us")
 "Legend of MTV" 2010 - A decisive influence on the formation and development of modern musical culture in Russia

External links 

Musical groups established in 1996
Russian hip hop musicians
Russian hip hop groups
Russian hip hop
Russian activists against the 2022 Russian invasion of Ukraine